XHQS-FM is a radio station in Fresnillo, Zacatecas. It broadcasts on 90.3 FM and carries a romantic music format known as Romántica 90.3 FM.

History
XEQS-AM received its concession on August 10, 1978. It was owned by José Bonilla Robles and broadcast as a 1 kW daytimer on 980 kHz. By the 1990s, XEQS was on 930, with a power of 10,000 watts during the day and a 1,000-watt nighttime service.

In 2011, XEQS was approved to migrate to FM with 25,000 watts.

References

External links
Romántica 90.3 fm Facebook

Spanish-language radio stations
Radio stations in Zacatecas